The Terror is the thirteenth studio album by experimental rock band the Flaming Lips, released on April 1, 2013 worldwide and April 16 in the U.S., on Warner Bros in the United States and Bella Union in the United Kingdom. It is the first album for band member Derek Brown. Lead vocalist Wayne Coyne described the album's general idea in a press release:"We want, or wanted, to believe that without love we would disappear, that love, somehow, would save us that, yeah, if we have love, give love and know love, we are truly alive and if there is no love, there would be no life. The Terror is, we know now, that even without love, life goes on... we just go on… there is no mercy killing." Experimental composer Dan Deacon remixed the album in its entirety.

Track listing

Personnel
The Flaming Lips
Wayne Coyne – vocals, guitar, synthesizers
Michael Ivins – bass, keyboards
Steven Drozd – guitar, keyboards, synthesizers, bass, drums, vocals
Kliph Scurlock – drums, percussion
Derek Brown – keyboards, guitar

Guest performers
Phantogram – additional vocals and music

Production
The Flaming Lips – production, mix, recording
Dave Fridmann – production, mix, recording, mastering
Scott Booker – production
Michael Ivins – additional engineering
Mack Hawkins – additional engineering, recording & mixing

Packaging
George Salisbury – layout and design

Charts

References

2013 albums
Bella Union albums
The Flaming Lips albums
Warner Records albums
Albums produced by Dave Fridmann
Albums recorded at Tarbox Road Studios